Brashten is a village in southwestern Bulgaria. It is located in the municipality of Dospat, Smolyan Province.

Geography 

The village of Brashten is located in the Western Rhodope Mountains. It is situated in the Chech region.

History 

According to Vasil Kanchov, in 1900 Brashten was populated by 220 Bulgarian Muslims, living in 50 houses.

Religion 

The population is Muslim. Most inhabitants of the village are Pomaks.

Sights 
 The remains of a Roman-style bridge.
 The memorial of Vergil Vaklinov - a ranger, considered by many to have been a hero.

Notes 

Villages in Smolyan Province
Chech